Throughout the history of literature, since the creation of bound texts in the forms of books and codices, various works have been published and written anonymously, often due to their political or controversial nature, or merely for the purposes of the privacy of their authors, among other reasons. This article provides a list of literary works published anonymously, either attributed to "Anonymous", or with no specific author's name given.

Not included in this list are works which predate the advent of publishing and general attribution of authorship, such as ancient written inscriptions (such as hieroglyphic or pictographical, transcribed texts), certain historical folklore and myths of oral traditions now published as text, and reference or plain texts (letters, notes, graffiti) recovered archaeologically, which are otherwise unimportant to literary studies. Religious texts and grimoires, which are often written anonymously, may appear, along with works initially written anonymously whose authors are now known.

This list is ordered alphabetically by title.

Works predating the Common Era

Ancient Mesopotamian works 

 Debate between bird and fish
 Enûma Eliš
 Hurrian hymn to Nikkal
 Inscriptions at Tell Abu Salabikh
 Instructions of Shuruppak, attributed to the historically debatable Shuruppak
 Kesh Temple Hymn
 Mesopotamian City Laments
 Lament for Ur
 Lament for Sumer and Ur
 Lament for Nippur
 Lament for Eridu
 Lament for Uruk
 Sumerian creation myth

Ancient Egyptian works 

 Ancient Egyptian funerary texts
 Coffin Texts
 New Kingdom funerary texts
 Book of the Dead
 Amduat
 Spell of the Twelve Caves
 The Book of Gates
 Book of the Netherworld
 Book of Caverns
 Book of the Earth
 Litany of Re
 Book of the Heavens
 Pyramid Texts
 Ancient Egyptian medical papyri

Other works 

 I Ching
 The Aesop Romance

Early classics 

 Cantar de Mio Cid
 Beowulf
 De Dubiis Nominibus
 Dresden Codex
 Sir Gawain and the Green Knight
 The Second Shepherds' Play
 "Enchiriadis" texts
 Scolica enchiriadis
 Musica enchiriadis
 The Battle of Maldon
 Diaries of Court Ladies of Old Japan
 Gesta Hungarorum
 The Secret History of the Mongols
 St. Erkenwald
 Corpus Hermeticum
 Poetic Edda
 The Lady of Escalot
One Thousand and One Nights

15th century

 The Book of Dede Korkut
 The pasquinades (satirical poems) glued to the Talking Statues of Rome. They still appear from time to time.
 The Key of Solomon
 The Skibby Chronicle
 La Farce de maître Pierre Pathelin
 Hypnerotomachia Poliphili, published anonymously at the time, now considered likely to have been written by Francesco Colonna
 The Voynich manuscript

16th century 

 Narrative of Some Things of New Spain and of the Great City of Temestitan
 Lazarillo de Tormes
 Chilam Balam

17th century
 Actio Curiosa
 Theophrastus redivivus
 The entire catalog of Pierre Marteau
 All works published after 1788 by Sylvain Maréchal
Vertue Rewarded

18th century
 An Essay on the Principle of Population by T.R. Malthus, originally published anonymously
 Anti-Machiavel by Frederick the Great, originally published anonymously
 Dream of the Red Chamber by Cao Xueqin, originally published anonymously
 The Sorrows of Yamba by Hannah More, originally published anonymously
 Common Sense (pamphlet) by Thomas Paine, originally published anonymously
 The Federalist Papers, by Alexander Hamilton, James Madison, and John Jay; originally published under the pseudonym "Publius"
 The Animated Skeleton
 The Cavern of Death

19th century 

 Frankenstein by Mary Shelley, originally published anonymously
 A Brief Inquiry into the Natural Rights of Man
 A Strange Manuscript Found in a Copper Cylinder by James De Mille, originally published anonymously.
 Democracy by Henry Adams, originally published anonymously.
 Elizabeth and Her German Garden by Elizabeth von Arnim, originally published anonymously.
 Fantasmagoriana by Jean-Baptiste Benoît Eyriès, published anonymously.
 Keep Cool by John Neal, published under the pseudonym "Somebody, M.D.C. &c. &c. &c.", in which "M.D.C." stands for "Member of the Delphian Club"
 Logan by John Neal
 Seventy-Six by John Neal, attributed to "the author of Logan"
 Might is Right, published under the pseudonym "Ragnar Redbeard". The most commonly claimed authors are Arthur Desmond or Jack London.
 Romance of Lust, originally published anonymously but variously attributed to Edward Sellon or William Simpson Potter
 Supernatural Religion: An Inquiry into the Reality of Divine Revelation by Walter Richard Cassels, originally published anonymously.
 Tales of the Dead, translated by Sarah Elizabeth Utterson, published anonymously.
 Tamerlane and Other Poems, the first published collection of poems by Edgar Allan Poe, originally published anonymously.
 The Log-Cabin Lady
 The Princess Ilsée
 The String of Pearls
 The Way of a Pilgrim
 The Great Organ in the Boston Music Hall
 Under the Greenwood Tree by Thomas Hardy, originally published anonymously.
 Vestiges of the Natural History of Creation by Robert Chambers (publisher, born 1802), as only revealed after his death

20th century
 Jack Pots by Eugene Edwards published in 1900 by Jamieson-Higgins. A collection of poker stories. Author is believed to be another pseudonym of S. W. Erdnase.
The Autobiography of a Flea, erotic novel published in 1901.
 The Expert at the Card Table by S. W. Erdnase, a book on sleight-of-hand with cards for card advantage play and magic, self-published in 1902 in Chicago.
 Josefine Mutzenbacher, erotic novel published in 1906, presumably written by Felix Salten.
The Autobiography of an Ex-Colored Man, the story of a young biracial man, was published anonymously in 1912 by James Weldon Johnson who revealed himself as the author in 1927.
The Strange Death of Adolf Hitler, anonymously written 1939 book which claims that Adolf Hitler died in 1938 and was subsequently impersonated by look-alikes.
Demian by Hermann Hesse, originally published under the pseudonym "Emil Sinclair"
 Go Ask Alice, now known to have been written by Beatrice Sparks.
 A Woman in Berlin, an anonymous diary detailing experiences of a German woman as Germany is defeated in World War II.
 Primary Colors, published anonymously. Journalist Joe Klein was immediately suspected as the author. He originally denied it, but admitted authorship within six months.

21st century
 Bourbon Kid, an ongoing supernatural horror series first published in 2000
 The Bride Stripped Bare, an erotic novel published in 2003; soon after, the author was revealed as the Australian writer Nikki Gemmell.
 Through Our Enemies' Eyes: Osama Bin Laden, Radical Islam and the Future of America (2003) and  Imperial Hubris: Why the West is Losing the War on Terror (2004) – both revealed to have been written by former CIA employee Michael Scheuer.
 Recipes for Disaster: An Anarchist Cookbook (2004) - published by the CrimethInc. collective.
 My Immortal (2006-2007) – A work of fiction settled in the Harry Potter universe involving goth subculture which has become a cult phenomenon.
 Rolling Thunder (2005–2014) – eleven issues of "an anarchist journal of dangerous living" published the CrimethInc collective.
 Diary of an Oxygen Thief (2006) – A Dutch novel about the independent art, literature, and music scene in Brooklyn, New York.
 O: A Presidential Novel (2011) – . A speculative novel about President Barack Obama's 2012 re-election campaign. The publishers, Simon & Schuster, claim that the book was written by someone who was "in the room" with the President.
 Lucy in the Sky (2012)
 Letting Ana Go (2013), the anonymous diary of an anorexic teenager, was published by Simon and Schuster with no discernible author.
 The Incest Diary (2017)
 A Warning (2019) – A book written by "a senior Trump administration official" that expands upon the anonymous 2018 essay I Am Part of the Resistance Inside the Trump Administration from The New York Times. In the week before the 2020 election, Miles Taylor, indeed a senior Trump official, revealed himself as the author of both the book and original essay.

See also 
 Anonymity
 Anonymity application
 Anonymous blogging
 Anonymous P2P
 Anonymous remailer
 Anonymous web browsing
 Anonymous work
 Notname
 List of anonymous masters
 List of works published under a pseudonym

References

External links
See http://onlinebooks.library.upenn.edu to find some of these texts on the web.
 

Lists of books
Works